Tzintzuntzan may refer to:
 Tzintzuntzan (Mesoamerican site), a pre-Columbian archaeological site in Mexico, former capital of the Tarascan state
 Tzintzuntzan, Michoacán, modern-day municipality and principal township serving as the administrative seat, in the state of Michoacán, Mexico
 Tzintzuntzan Municipality, whose seat is Tzintzuntzan, Michoacán